Alexander "Alexx" Wesselsky (born 18 November 1968) is a German singer. He is the lead vocalist of Neue Deutsche Härte band Eisbrecher and previously performed with Megaherz from 1993 to 2003.

Biography
In 1985, Dale Arden became Wesselsky's first band, where he performed as lead singer and bassist alongside his best friend Bill Parsons in the early 1980s at a local bar.

Megaherz: 1993–2003
Wesselsky joined Megaherz in 1993 as one of the founding members, writing lyrics and composing, as well as singing. Wesselsky has had moderate success during his time with Megaherz, his albums Himmelfahrt, released in 2000 and Herzwerk II, released in 2002, both charted in the Media Control Charts at No. 78. His most successful single during his time with Megaherz, Freiflug, was released in 1999 and hit the German alternative charts at No. 7.

Wesselsky left the band officially on 1 January 2003, and was replaced by Mathias Eisholz. In addition to Megaherz, since 1999 he has been working as a studio singer and lyricist writer for several independent projects (among others, a platinum production).

Eisbrecher: 2003–present

He joined Noel Pix in late 2002 to form Eisbrecher. Success for Wesselsky continued through Eisbrecher with the 2004 album of the same name, released in January, as it hit the alternative charts in Germany at No. 13.

Eisbrecher's 2006 album, Antikörper, was released in October and hit the Media Control Charts at No. 85. Their next single "Kann denn Liebe Sünde sein?", released in July 2008, hit the alternative charts at No. 3. The studio album Sünde was released in August 2008 and entered the Media Control Charts at a high No. 18. On 16 April 2010, Eisbrecher released their next album, Eiszeit, which hit Germany's chart at No. 5. Their following release, Die Hölle muss warten, was released on 3 February 2012 and charted No. 3 on the German main charts. Schock was released on 21 January 2015 and charted at No. 2 on the German main charts. 

Both Die Hölle muss warten and Schock achieved gold status in 2016, after both sold more than 100,000 units respectively. His latest effort, Sturmfahrt, became his first album to hit No. 1 on the main German chart. 

In addition to his studio musical career, Wesselsky has performed with his bands at many European music festivals, including Hurricane, Nova Rock, Wacken, M'era Luna, Wave-Gotik-Treffen, Hellfest, Graspop Metal Meeting, and Summer Breeze.

Television
Aside from his musical career, Wesselsky has also presented a television show since 2006, on the German TV channel DMAX, where he acts as a used car broker for an applicant. His screen nickname for the show is Der Checker ("The Checker"). Once he has found a suitable vehicle within the applicant's budget, the car is repaired and tuned at co-presenter's Lina van de Mars's workshop, and is then handed over to the new owner. In 2009, Wesselsky hosted a reality TV show called Schrauber-Showdown. In May 2010, he appeared as himself on the German TV talkshow Kölner Treff.

Discography

Studio albums

Singles
Megaherz
1997: "Gott sein" (To Be God)
1998: "Liebestöter" (Passion Killer)
1998: "Rock Me Amadeus"
1999: "Freiflug" (Free Flight) (#7 in German alternative charts)
2000: "Himmelfahrt" (Ascension)

Eisbrecher
2003: "Mein Blut" (My Blood)
2003: "Fanatica"
2006: "Leider" (Unfortunately)
2006: "Leider/Vergissmeinnicht" (US limited double-single)
2006: "Vergissmeinnicht" (Forget Me Not)
2008: "Kann denn Liebe Sünde sein?" (Can Love be a Sin?)
2010: "Eiszeit" (Ice Age) (#84 in Germany)
2012: "Verrückt" (Insane) (#46 in Germany)
2012: "Die Hölle muss warten" (Hell Has to Wait)
2012: "Miststück 2012" (Sonofabitch)
2013: "10 Jahre Eisbrecher" (10 Years of Eisbrecher)
2014: "Zwischen uns" (Between Us)
2015: "1000 Narben" (1,000 Scars)
2015: "Rot wie die Liebe" (Red Like Love)
2017: "Was ist hier los?" (What's Going on Here?)
2018: "Das Gesetz" (The Law)

EPs
Megaherz
2007: Freiflug EP: The Early Years (1996–2000)
2008: Mann von Welt EP

Compilation albums
Megaherz
2001: Querschnitt
2009: Totgesagte leben länger (tracks 1–3, 5, 6, 8, 9, 11, 12, 14)

Eisbrecher
2011: Eiskalt (#69 in Germany)
2018: Ewiges Eis (#6 in Germany)
2020: Schicksalsmelodien (#4 in Germany)

Music videos
1999: "Freiflug" (Free Flight)
2004: "Schwarze Witwe" (Black Widow)
2005: "Herz steht still" (Heart Stands Still)
2006: "Willkommen im Nichts" (Welcome to Nothing)
2006: "Vergissmeinnicht" (Forget Me Not)
2010: "Eiszeit" (Ice Age)
2011: "Verrückt" (Insane)
2012: "Die Hölle muss warten" (Hell Has to Wait)
2012: "Miststück 2012" (Sonofabitch 2012)
2014: "Zwischen uns" (Between Us)
2015: "Rot wie die Liebe" (Red Like Love)
2017: "Was ist hier los?" (What's Going on Here?)
2018: "Das Gesetz" (The Law)
2020: "Stossgebet" (Quick Prayer)
2020: "Skandal im Sperrbezirk" (Scandal in Prostitution-free Area)
2020: "Out of the Dark"
2021: "FAKK"
2021: "Im Guten, im Bösen" (The Good, The Bad)

Appearances
IFF (vocals) – Königin der Nacht
2012 – Lord of the Lost (vocals) – Eure Siege
2019 – Hamatom (vocals)

References

External links

 

1968 births
Living people
German heavy metal singers
German male singers